Seibert is a statutory town in Kit Carson County, Colorado, United States. The population was 181 at the 2010 census and is, as of 2018, estimated to be 216.

A post office called Seibert has been in operation since 1888. The community was named after Henry Seibert, a railroad agent.

Geography
Seibert is located at  (39.299456, -102.870204).

Climate

Demographics

As of the census of 2000, there were 180 people, 93 households, and 54 families residing in the town. The racial makeup of the town was 95.56% White, 0.56% Native American, and 3.89% from two or more races. Hispanic or Latino of any race were 2.22% of the population.

There were 93 households, out of which 16.1% had children under the age of 18 living with them, 48.4% were married couples living together, 7.5% had a female householder with no husband present, and 40.9% were non-families. 36.6% of all households were made up of individuals, and 21.5% had someone living alone who was 65 years of age or older.  The average household size was 1.94 and the average family size was 2.51.

In the town, the population was spread out, with 16.1% under the age of 18, 1.7% from 18 to 24, 26.1% from 25 to 44, 26.7% from 45 to 64, and 29.4% who were 65 years of age or older.  The median age was 49 years. For every 100 females there were 106.9 males.  For every 100 females age 18 and over, there were 93.6 males.

The median income for a household in the town was $24,583, and the median income for a family was $32,083. Males had a median income of $30,000 versus $12,500 for females. The per capita income for the town was $16,806.  About 7.8% of families and 13.3% of the population were below the poverty line, including 25.0% of those under the age of eighteen and 8.9% of those 65 or over.

See also

 List of municipalities in Colorado

References

External links

 Town of Seibert
 CDOT map of the Town of Seibert

Towns in Kit Carson County, Colorado